Sankt Peter-Freienstein is a municipality in the district of Leoben in Austrian state of Styria.

Geography
The municipality lies on the southeast edge of the Eisenerz Alps the Vordernberger valley.

References

Cities and towns in Leoben District